"Lo Haré Por Ti" is a song recorded by Mexican singer Paulina Rubio  for her fifth studio album Paulina (2000). Written by Estefano and produced by Chris Rodriguez, the bolero-influenced pop-rock song was then released as the lead single from Paulina on January 11, 2000, through Universal Music Latin, Polydor Records and Muxxic Records (in Spain). The song was considered Rubio's "comeback" single after the dissolution of her contract with EMI Music in the late 1990s. Lyrically, the song is about a woman who is willing to do anything for the man she loves, with refers to the tangos of the French Argentine artist Carlos Gardel.

Reception

Critical 
Upon its release, "Lo Haré Por Ti" was considered Rubio's "comeback" single after the dissolution of her music contract with EMI in the late 1990s. The song received acclaim reviews from music critics, who singled it out as one of the highlights from the album and praised the singer for her new musical style. Billboards Leila Cobo said that "[the song is] an edgy, catchy, totally fresh romp". She also appreciated that thanks to this single chosen by the lead single, helped make the album a success. 

 Commercial 
Commercially, the single was a success in Latin American and some European countries. In Spain, "Lo Haré Por Ti" ascended to the top ten airplay Los 40 Principales, finally peaking at number eight on the week of October 21, 2000.

 Music video 
The accompanying music video for "Lo Haré Por Ti" was directed by Carlos Somonte and it was filmed in Acapulco, Guerrero in México. As the song was meant to be Rubio's "comeback" single, it marked a clip with "a more innovative style" and different from her previous productions. The video premiered worldwide on March 20, 2000.

In a retrospective review, El Heraldo de México noted the great influence of Rubio's style on the culture, claiming that many girls wanted to imitate her style "with the iconic hat."
 Track listing and formats US CD Single "Lo Haré Por Ti" (Album Remix) – 3:55Spanish CD Single "Lo Haré Por Ti" – 4:41Spanish CD Remix "Lo Haré Por Ti" (Single Remix) – 4:02Spanish Remixes "Lo Haré Por Ti" (Album Version) – 4:41
 "Lo Haré Por Ti" (Radio Remix) – 4:02
 "Lo Haré Por Ti" (Extended Remix) – 5:05
 "Lo Haré Por Ti" (Single Remix) – 4:31
 "Lo Haré Por Ti" (Extended Remix) – 6:10Mexican Vinyl 7" A. "Lo Haré Por Ti" – 4:41
 B. "Y Yo Sigo Aquí" – 4:13European CD Single "Lo Haré Por Ti" (Album Version) – 4:41
 "Lo Haré Por Ti" (Mijangos Radio Album Remix) - 4:14Brazilian Maxi Single—Remixes'
 "Lo Haré Por Ti" (Album Version) – 4:41
 "Lo Haré Por Ti" (Hitmakers Radio Edit) – 3:51
 "Lo Haré Por Ti" (Memé's Radio Hit) – 5:15
 "Lo Haré Por Ti" (Mijangos Radio Edit) – 4:40
 "Lo Haré Por Ti" (Single Remix) – 4:30
 "Lo Haré Por Ti" (Hitmakers Extended Mix) – 4:57
 "Lo Haré Por Ti" (Hitmakers Extended Club Mix) – 8:54
 "Lo Haré Por Ti" (Mijangos Extended Mix) – 10:03
 "Lo Haré Por Ti" (Extended Remix) – 5:08

Charts

Weekly charts

Year-end charts

References 

Paulina Rubio songs
Spanish-language songs
Songs written by Estéfano
Universal Music Latino singles
1999 songs

2000 singles
2000 songs